Jane Skinner (born February 12, 1967) is an American former daytime news anchor who worked for Fox News, co-hosting Happening Now with Jon Scott from 11 am to 1 pm ET. On June 24, 2010, she announced on-air her retirement from her daytime news anchor position at the end of her usual Happening Now segment, citing a desire to spend more time with her family. She is married to NFL Commissioner Roger Goodell.

Early life
Jane Skinner was raised in Lake Forest, Illinois, and graduated from Lake Forest High School in 1985. Skinner received her bachelor's and master's degrees from Northwestern University.

Career
Skinner began her career as a political correspondent for KBJR in Duluth, Minnesota. She joined Fox News as a general reporter from WNBC-TV in New York City. Previously, she worked at WITI in Milwaukee, where she was an anchor, establishing the station's primetime newscast after that station became a Fox affiliate. She has also been a general-assignment reporter for KMOV in St. Louis and WCSH in Portland, Maine.

Before appearing on Happening Now, Skinner hosted the 2 pm ET edition of Fox News Live and hosted a segment on Studio B called "Skinnerville". Previous to that, she hosted Sunday Best, which featured highlights from the previous week's programming on the channel. She was also featured for a time on The Big Story with John Gibson.

Personal life
Her father is Sam Skinner, former Secretary of Transportation and White House Chief of Staff under President George H. W. Bush.  On October 25, 1997, she married now-NFL Commissioner Roger Goodell and resides in Westchester, New York, with their twin daughters, born in 2001.

References

External links

1967 births
Living people
Television anchors from Chicago
American reporters and correspondents
American television journalists
American women television journalists
Fox News people
Lake Forest High School (Illinois) alumni
Northwestern University alumni
20th-century American women
21st-century American women
20th-century American journalists
21st-century American journalists